Cem Karaca (born 8 May 1976) is a Turkish-German football coach and former player who played as a midfielder.

Club career
He started his career in Germany playing for 1. FC Kaiserslautern and FC St. Pauli before spending most of his career in Turkey with Yimpaş Yozgatspor, Fenerbahçe, Konyaspor, Kayserispor, Sivasspor, and İstanbulspor.

He played once for the Turkish B national team and three times for the U21.

In the 2000–01 season, he was suspended from football for six months after doping test.

References

External links
 

1976 births
Living people
German people of Turkish descent
People from Main-Taunus-Kreis
Sportspeople from Darmstadt (region)
Turkish footballers
Footballers from Hesse
Association football midfielders
Turkey B international footballers
Turkey youth international footballers
Turkey under-21 international footballers
1. FC Kaiserslautern II players
1. FC Kaiserslautern players
FC St. Pauli players
Fenerbahçe S.K. footballers
Konyaspor footballers
Kayserispor footballers
Sivasspor footballers
İstanbulspor footballers
2. Bundesliga players
Doping cases in association football
Turkish sportspeople in doping cases
Turkish football managers
Eskişehirspor managers
Turkish expatriate football managers
Expatriate football managers in Greece
Turkish expatriate sportspeople in Greece